Raluca Olaru and Valeria Solovyeva were the defending champions, but Solovyeva chose not to participate this year. Olaru played alongside Shahar Pe'er.

Michaëlla Krajicek and Karolína Plíšková won the title, defeating Olaru and Pe'er in the final, 6–0, 4–6, [10–6].

Seeds

Draw

Draw

References
 Main Draw

Nurnberger Versicherungscupandnbsp;- Doubles
2014 Doubles
2014 in German tennis